Events from the year 1806 in Russia

Incumbents
 Monarch – Alexander I

Events

 
 
  
  
  St Petersburg College for the Deaf
 Saint-Petersburg Elizabethan Institute is founded.

Births

Deaths

 Elena von Rehbinder, industrialist

References

1806 in Russia
Years of the 19th century in the Russian Empire